Mon Repos is a villa on the island of Corfu, Greece. It lies south of Corfu City in the forest of Palaeopolis. Since 2001, it has housed the Museum of Palaiopolis—Mon Repos.

History
The villa was built as a summer residence for the British Lord High Commissioner of the United States of the Ionian Islands, Frederick Adam, and his second wife (a Corfiot), Diamantina 'Nina' Palatino, in 1828–1831, although they had to vacate the villa soon afterwards in 1832 when Adam was sent to serve in India. The villa was rarely used as a residence for later British governors. In 1833, it housed a school of fine arts, while in 1834, the park was opened to the public. Empress Elisabeth of Austria stayed there in 1863. Here she fell in love with the island, where she later built the Achilleion Palace.

After the union with Greece in 1864, the villa was granted to King George I of the Hellenes as a summer residence; he renamed it "Mon Repos" (French for "My Rest"). The royal family used it as a summer residence up until King Constantine II fled the country in 1967. The villa subsequently became derelict, but was restored in the 1990s.

Several royal births have taken place at the villa, including those of Princess Sophie of Greece and Denmark on 26 June 1914, It was the birthplace of Prince Philip, Duke of Edinburgh (the husband of Queen Elizabeth II), and Princess Alexia of Greece and Denmark. Philip was born on the dining room table.

Confiscation
The villa was confiscated under controversial circumstances some years after the declaration of the Hellenic Republic in 1974. Its confiscation, and the confiscation of other property of the deposed and exiled King Constantine II, without any compensation, led to a court case in the European Court of Human Rights.

The King's argument centred on the claim that the property in question was acquired by his predecessors legally and was therefore subject to regular personal inheritance. The Greek state argued that because the property was either used by the royal family by virtue of its sovereign status or obtained by taking advantage of that status, once the monarchy was abolished, the property reverted to public ownership automatically.

The Court ordered the Hellenic Republic to pay the exiled king compensation of less than 1% of its worth and allowed the Greek state to retain ownership of the property.

References

Sources

External links
 
 Hellenic Ministry of Culture and Tourism – Archaeological Museum of Palaeopolis

19th-century architecture in Greece
Archaeological museums in Greece
Architecture of Corfu
Buildings and structures in Corfu (city)
Museums in Corfu
Neoclassical architecture in Greece
Palaces in Greece
Royal residences in Greece